Olshansky  or Olshanski are  East Slavic toponymic surnames associated with the places  Olshana, Olshanka, Olshany, Halshany. The Belrusian-language rendering of the surname are Halshansky, Alshansky,  Polish: Olszański, Holszański, Lithuanian: Olšanski, Alšėniškis. Feminine variants: Olshanska, Olshanskaya, Hoshanska, Halshanskaya. Notable people with the surname include:

Members of the Olshanski/Holshansky noble family (Alšėniškiai), which can be variously styled in East Slavic, Polish, or Lithuanian ways
Barbara Olshansky, American human rights lawyer
Igor Olshansky (born 1982), American football player
 Ivan Olshansky (died in or after 1402), progenitor of the Lithuanian princely Alšėniškiai (Holshansky) family
Konstantin Olshansky, (1915-1944), Ukrainian Hero of the Soviet Union
Paweł Holszański (1485-1555)
S. Jay Olshansky (born 1954), professor in the School of Public Health at the University of Illinois at Chicago
 Semyon Olshanski (died in 1505 or 1506), noble from the Holshansky family
Sergei Olshansky (born 1948), Soviet football player
Sophia Holshanska, or Sophia of Halshany (1405-1461), Queen of Poland as the fourth and last wife of Jogaila, King of Poland and Supreme Duke of Lithuania
Uliana Olshanska (died 1448), noblewoman from the Olshanski (Holshanski, Alšėniškiai) family, the second wife of Vytautas, Grand Duke of Lithuania
Vladimir Olshansky (born 1947), Russian performing artist, director, composer, sculptor
Yelena Olshanskaya, original name of Elena Miller, a Russian who, as alleged by the Canadian Security Intelligence Service (CSIS), lived in Canada as a spy
Juliana Olshanskaya (1525-1540), noblewoman, saint in the Eastern Orthodox Church

See also

Ukrainian-language surnames
Belarusian-language surnames
Ukrainian toponymic surnames
Belorusian toponymic surnames